The Balmoral Reef Plate is a small tectonic plate (microplate) located in the south Pacific north of Fiji. Clockwise from the north, it borders the Pacific Plate, Australian Plate, Conway Reef Plate, and the New Hebrides Plate. The northern and western borders are a divergent boundary while the rest of the borders are transform and convergent boundaries. The Balmoral Reef Plate's ocean crust is less than 12 million years old and is spreading between the New Hebrides and Tonga subduction.

References
 Bird, P. (2003) An updated digital model of plate boundaries, Geochemistry, Geophysics, Geosystems, 4(3), 1027, . 
 Bird, P., Y. Y. Kagan, and D. D. Jackson, Plate tectonics and earthquake potential of spreading ridges and oceanic transform faults, in Plate Boundary Zones, Geophys. Monogr. Ser., vol. 30, edited by S. Stein and J. T. Freymueller, 203–218, AGU, Washington, D. C.,
2002.

Tectonic plates
Geology of the Pacific Ocean